Giro di Trento  may refer to:
Giro al Sas, an annual road running event in Trento, Italy
Giro del Trentino, an annual road cycling competition which passes through the same city